Martinus Richter is a German orthopaedic surgeon, and Associate Professor at the Hannover Medical School and Head of the Department for Foot and Ankle Surgery Nuremberg and Rummelsberg at the Hospital Rummelsberg and Sana-Hospital Nuremberg.

Clinical and scientific contribution 
In the scientific field, Richter and his team developed a score for diagnosing and tracking foot and ankle conditions.

Richter developed a form of pedography for force and pressure measurement that can be used during operations to assess mechanical function.

He developed a form of computer assisted surgery for foot and ankle corrections.

He has run clinical trials on a variation of articular cartilage stem cell paste grafting to treat cartilage defects in feet and ankles.

He also developed several implants for foot and ankle surgery.

Awards 
 2009 Leonard J. Goldner Award der American Orthopaedic Foot and Ankle Society (AOFAS) at the 25th Annual Summer Meeting, Vancouver, Canada, 2009

References 

German orthopedic surgeons
1968 births
Living people